Louis Golding (19 November 1895 – 9 August 1958) was an English writer, very famous in his time especially for his novels, though he is now largely neglected; he wrote also short stories, essays, fantasies, travel books, and poetry.

Life
Born in Manchester, Lancashire into a Ukrainian-Jewish family, Golding was educated at Manchester Grammar School and Queen's College, Oxford. He used his Manchester background (as 'Doomington') and Jewish themes in his novels, the first of which was published while he was still an undergraduate (his student time was interrupted by service in World War I). Golding described Edgar Allan Poe and Alfred, Lord Tennyson as influences on his poetry.

His novel Magnolia Street was a bestseller of 1932; it is based on the Hightown area of Manchester, as it was in the 1920s. It features, authentically enough, a street divided into 'gentile' and 'Jewish' sides. It was a 1939 play for Charles B. Cochran in an adaptation by Golding and A. E. Rawlinson, and was also filmed as Magnolia Street Story.

Golding described his politics as "strongly to the left". In 1932, the Hogarth Press published Golding's A Letter to Adolf Hitler, an attack on anti-Semitism and Nazism. In 1940, Golding also criticized the Soviet Invasion of Finland.

Boucher and McComas named Honey for the Ghost the best supernatural novel of 1949, saying it "begins with infinite leisure but builds to an incomparable climactic terror."

Film screenplays on which Golding collaborated included that of the Paul Robeson film The Proud Valley (1940); this work with Robeson may have led to his later visa problems with the U.S. authorities. He also was involved in the script of the 1944 film of his novel Mr. Emmanuel.

Golding employed Gillian Freeman as a literary secretary. Freeman later became a novelist and screenwriter, often using her time with Golding as inspiration for her work.

Works
Sorrow of War (1919) poems
Forward from Babylon (1920) novel
Shepherd Singing Ragtime: and other poems (1921)
Prophet and Fool (1923) poems
Seacoast Of Bohemia (1923)
Sunward (1924) travel
Sicilian Noon (1925) travel
Day of Atonement (1925) novel
Luigi of Catanzaro (1926)
The Miracle Boy (1927) novel
Store of Ladies (1927)
Those Ancient Lands Being a Journey to Palestine (1928) travel
The Prince or Somebody (1929)
Adventures in Living Dangerously (1930)
Give up Your Lovers (1930)
Magnolia Street (1932) novel
A letter to Adolf Hitler (1932)
James Joyce (1933) criticism
The Doomington Wanderer (1934) stories
Five Silver Daughters (1934) Tales of the Silver Sisters (1)
The Camberwell Beauty (1935) novel
The Pursuer (1936) novel
In the Steps of Moses the Lawgiver [1937]
The Jewish Problem (1938) non-fiction
Mr. Emmanuel (1939) Tales of the Silver Sisters (2)
Hitler through the Ages (1939) non-fiction
The World I Knew (1940) non-fiction
We Shall Eat and Drink Again (1944) with André Simon, essays on food and drink
The Vicar of Dunkerly Briggs (1944) novel
Who's There Within? (1944) novel
The Call of the Hand: And Other Stories (1944) stories
Pale Blue Nightgown: A Book of Tales (1944) stories
No News from Helen (1945) novel
The Glory of Elsie Silver (1945) Tales of the Silver Sisters (3)
The Dance Goes On (1947) novel
Bareknuckle Lover; and Other Stories (1947)
Three Jolly Gentlemen (1949) novel
Honey for the Ghost (1949) novel
The Dangerous Places (1951) Tales of the Silver Sisters (4)
To the Quayside (1954) (Ghostwritten by Emanuel Litvinoff)
The Bareknuckle Breed (1952)(Ghostwritten by Emanuel Litvinoff), published by Hutchinson & Co Ltd
The Loving Brothers (1953) novel
The Little Old Admiral (1958)
The Frightening Talent (1973) novel

References

Further reading

External links 
 Encyclopædia Britannica
 
 
 
 

1895 births
1958 deaths
20th-century English male writers
20th-century English novelists
20th-century English poets
English anti-fascists
English Jewish writers
English male novelists
English male poets
People educated at Manchester Grammar School
Ukrainian Jews
Writers from Manchester
British military personnel of World War I
Military personnel from Manchester